Kathryn M. "Katie" Thompson Farmer (born c. 1970) is an American railroad executive. In January 2021, she became the first woman chief executive of a Class I railroad succeeding Carl Ice at BNSF Railway.

Biography
Kathryn M. Farmer graduated from Texas Christian University with a Bachelor of Business Administration and an MBA in Finance.

Farmer joined Burlington Northern Railroad in 1992 as a management trainee. She has spent her entire career at BNSF (Burlington Northern merged with Santa Fe in 1996 to become BNSF and became wholly owned by Berkshire Hathaway in 2010), holding positions in operations, marketing and finance. Farmer served as the Executive Vice President Operations title since September 2018. In September 2020, it was announced that she would succeed Carl Ice as President and Chief Executive Officer, and also lead BNSF's Board of Directors, effective January 1, 2021. Matt Igoe took over her vacated role as Executive Vice President Operations.

Farmer is a member of the Board of Trustees of Texas Christian University.

References

Texas Christian University alumni
Living people
BNSF Railway people
21st-century American railroad executives
1970 births
21st-century American businesswomen
21st-century American businesspeople